Harold Burton Gault (March 30, 1896 – October 4, 1955) was a Canadian politician. He served in the Legislative Assembly of New Brunswick as member of the Liberal party from 1948 to 1952.

References

1896 births
1955 deaths
20th-century Canadian politicians
New Brunswick Liberal Association MLAs
Politicians from Saint John, New Brunswick